Hypericum attenuatum, is a species of perennial herbaceous flowering plant in the family Hypericaceae.

References

attenuatum
Taxa named by Jacques Denys Choisy